Pingle is a town in Mengjin County, Luoyang, Henan. , it administers Pingle Residential Community and the following 19 villages:
Dongzhao Village
Xiangzhuang Village
You Village
Zhaiquan Village
Jin Village
Shangtun Village
Zhucang Village
Tianhuangling Village
Zhangjia'ao Village
Dingjiagou Village
Shanggu Village
Zhangpan Village
Xinzhuang Village
Houying Village
Taicang Village
Ma Village
Liupo Village
Donglümiao Village
Zhouli Village

References

Luoyang
Township-level divisions of Henan